Howmeh Rural District is a rural district (dehestan) in the Central District of Khalilabad County, Razavi Khorasan province, Iran. At the 2006 census, its population was 10,231, in 2,738 families.  The rural district has 6 villages.

References 

Rural Districts of Razavi Khorasan Province
Khalilabad County